Hofheim (Ried) station is a railway station in the municipality of Hofheim, located in the Bergstraße district in Hesse, Germany.

References

Railway stations in Hesse
Buildings and structures in Bergstraße (district)